WBCO (1540 AM) is a radio station licensed to serve the community of Bucyrus, Ohio.  The station currently features a classic country format.

WBCO also airs 24 hours per day on FM translator W298CC at 107.5 FM.

History
WBCO was founded in 1962 by Thomas P. Moore and wife J. LaVonne Moore, along with LaVonne's brother and pioneer in broadcasting, Orville J. Sather, and investors. WBCO was joined by sister-station WBCO-FM (later named WQEL) two years later. The company was first known as Brokensword Broadcasting Co. When the Moores and Sathers bought out the investors, it became Sa-Mor Stations. Full ownership was assumed by Tom and LaVonne following Orville's death.  The stations were sold to Mike and Donna Laipply in 1991. In 1996, both stations were sold to the Ohio Radio Group based in Ashland Ohio who also owned stations WQIO and WMVO in Mount Vernon, Ohio, WNCO & WNCO-FM in Ashland, Ohio, WMAN-FM in Fredericktown, Ohio, WFXN-FM in Galion, Ohio and WXXF in Loudonville, Ohio. They would later add local WYNT in Upper Sandusky, Ohio to the group making it the largest radio ownership company in Ohio. In 2001, Ohio Radio Group was purchased by Clear Channel Communications which had to sell two stations that included WBCO and WQEL who was purchased by Scantland Broadcasting, then current Saga Communications.

On February 1, 2016 WBCO changed their format from adult standards to classic country.

Previous logo

References

External links
WBCO official website

BCO
Classic country radio stations in the United States
Radio stations established in 1962
BCO